The Cricket Association of Uttarakhand (CAU) is the governing body of the cricket activities in the Indian state of Uttarakhand and the Uttarakhand cricket team. It is affiliated with the Board of Control for Cricket in India.

Hira Singh Bisht was the founding president of the Cricket Association of Uttarakhand.

History

After Uttarakhand came into existence in year 2000, even by 2008 the state did not have a cricket team due to multiple cricket associations from the state applied for BCCI affiliation. In 2015, 3 of the 5 associations united under Uttarakhand Cricket Association to try to get BCCI affiliation. In 2017, United Cricket Association left the union and merged with Cricket Association of Uttarakhand (CAU). In 2018, when the cricket team started playing, BCCI had to constitute a Uttarakhand Cricket Consensus Committee to run the affairs of cricket in the state. In 2019, BCCI granted Cricket Association of Uttarakhand (CAU) its  full membership. Uttarakhand Cricket Association failed to make through adequate criteria of BCCI, while Uttaranchal Cricket Association was rejected due to its lower revenue in comparison to CAU.

In June 2020, Wasim Jaffer was announced as the head coach of Uttarakhand cricket team for 2020-21 season.

Governing body
Elections for the Cricket Association of Uttarakhand were held on September 12, 2019. The elections were held unopposed and the following office bearers were elected:
 President: Jot Singh Gunsola
 Vice President: Sanjay Rawat
 General Secretary: Mahim Verma
 Joint Secretary: Avinish Verma
 Treasurer: Prithvi Singh Negi
 Member : Deepak Mehra

Staff
Coach:
Bhaskar Pillai 
Gursharan Singh 
Wasim Jaffer 
Manish Jha

Home ground
 Rajiv Gandhi International Cricket Stadium, Dehradun

See also
 Uttarakhand cricket team
 Uttarakhand women's cricket team
 Board of Control for Cricket in India
 List of members of the Board of Control for Cricket in India
 Cricket in India
 Uttarakhand State Football Association

References

Sports governing bodies in India
Cricket administration in India
Sports organizations established in 2006
Organisations based in Uttarakhand
Cricket in Uttarakhand
2006 establishments in Uttarakhand